Sebastián Saavedra (born 2 June 1990) is a Colombian racing driver from Bogotá. In 2014, he drove for KVSH Racing in the Verizon IndyCar Series before being replaced by former GP2 Series driver Stefano Coletti.

Racing career

Early career
After a childhood in karting, Saavedra drove in Formula BMW USA for Gelles Racing, finishing 11th in points. He also drove in two races in Formula BMW ADAC and competed in the Formula BMW World Final, finishing 32nd. In 2007 he switched teams in Formula BMW USA to Eurointernational and captured one win and finished 12th in points despite only competing in 8 of 14 races. He also competed in 6 Formula BMW Asia races capturing 3 wins, two races in Formula BMW ADAC, and finished 4th in the Formula BMW World Final. In 2008 he moved to ATS Formel 3 Cup and finished 2nd in points with 3 wins for HS Technik Motorsport. He also competed in a number of Austria Formula 3 Cup races and finished 9th in points.

Indy Lights and 2010 Indy 500
In 2009 he signed to drive in the American Firestone Indy Lights Series in 2009 for defending championship team AGR-AFS Racing alongside teammate J. R. Hildebrand. He captured his first Indy Lights win in the fourth race of the season and the first on an oval, at Kansas Speedway in April. In July he won from the pole on the streets of Toronto.

He returned to the series in 2010 for Bryan Herta Autosport and made his IndyCar Series debut in the 2010 Indianapolis 500 driving for the same team. Saavedra was on the bubble during most of qualifying during bump day, and crashed during practice laps while waiting for other drivers to attempt to qualify. While he was in the hospital being checked out, and with no working car to attempt to re-qualify, Saavedra appeared out of the race when Tony Kanaan bettered his time knocking him out of the field. However, when both Paul Tracy and Jay Howard withdrew their successful qualifying times and failed to re-qualify (both felt they would be knocked out by other drivers if they did not improve), Saavedra improbably ended up back in position thirty-three and in the race when time ran out for attempts. Saavedra crashed out in a single car accident on lap 159 and was credited with 23rd place in the race. The following month, Saavedra captured Bryan Herta Autosport's second Indy Lights win in the AvoidTheStork.com 100 at Iowa Speedway.

On 4 September 2010, Saavedra officially terminated his contract with Bryan Herta Autosport due to the team's inability to meet contract standards after a string of car failures and negative results.

IndyCar Series
Saavedra competed in the IndyCar Series season finale at Homestead Miami Speedway for Conquest Racing. He signed on to return to Conquest for the full 2011 IndyCar Series season in the team's No. 34 car. Driving for the single-car Conquest team, Saavedra's best finish was eleventh in the 2011 São Paulo Indy 300. Saavedra failed to qualify for the 2011 Indianapolis 500 while his one-off teammate Pippa Mann qualified for the race. He was replaced in the Conquest car by João Paulo de Oliveira for the Motegi race and Dillon Battistini at the Kentucky Speedway, but returned to the car for the season finale in Las Vegas, which was cancelled after Dan Wheldon's fatal crash. Saavedra finished 25th in the final championship standings.

For 2012 Saavedra returned to AFS Racing/Andretti Autosport to race a full season in Indy Lights and also drove in the IndyCar Series in the 2012 Indianapolis 500 as well as the series' races at Sonoma Raceway and Auto Club Speedway.

For 2014, Saavedra signed with KV Racing Technology, racing under the KV/AFS banner. In the inaugural Grand Prix of Indianapolis, Saavedra qualified 1st with a time of 01:23.8822. He stalled at the start and was struck by the cars of Carlos Muñoz and Mikhail Aleshin while still stationary. His best result throughout the year was 9th in Long Beach.

In 2015, Saavedra joined Chip Ganassi Racing split time in the No. 8 with Sage Karam. Saavedra ran the Indy 500 in a fifth car entered by Ganassi with the No. 17. During the race, Saavedra collided with Jack Hawksworth and hit the Turn 4 wall. After bouncing off, his car was hit just in front of the driver's cockpit by Stefano Coletti. Saavedra was unable to leave the accident under his own power; Saavedra's boot had to be cut off to remove him from the car, after which he was carried by the safety team into an ambulance. Saavedra participated in two more races during the season before being released by Ganassi at season end.

For 2017, Saavedra was signed to drive the Indianapolis 500 for the new Juncos Racing team in the No. 17 car. He placed 15th, matching his career best finish in the 500. Later in the season, Saavedra was signed to drive at Toronto in the No. 7 car for Schmidt Peterson Motorsports, replacing Mikhail Aleshin for the race weekend.

IMSA career

In 2019, Saavedra participated on  International Motor Sports Association (IMSA) 24 Hours of Daytona race, winning the LMP2 class in the #18 DragonSpeed Oreca 07, piloted by Pastor Maldonado, Roberto Gonzalez,  Ryan Cullen and himself, overcoming an engine problem which nearly jeopardized his race.

Racing record

American open–wheel racing results 
(key)

Indy Lights

IndyCar Series

 1 The Las Vegas Indy 300 was abandoned after Dan Wheldon died from injuries sustained in a 15-car crash on lap 11.

Indianapolis 500

Complete WeatherTech SportsCar Championship

Complete Global RallyCross Championship results

Supercar

References

External links

IndyCar Driver Page

1990 births
Living people
Colombian racing drivers
German Formula Three Championship drivers
Sportspeople from Bogotá
Indy Lights drivers
IndyCar Series drivers
Colombian IndyCar Series drivers
Indianapolis 500 drivers
Formula BMW ADAC drivers
Formula BMW USA drivers
24 Hours of Daytona drivers
WeatherTech SportsCar Championship drivers
Global RallyCross Championship drivers
Chip Ganassi Racing drivers
AFS Racing drivers
Eifelland Racing drivers
DragonSpeed drivers
Starworks Motorsport drivers
Conquest Racing drivers
Andretti Autosport drivers
Bryan Herta Autosport drivers
Dragon Racing drivers
Juncos Hollinger Racing drivers
KV Racing Technology drivers
Austrian Formula Three Championship drivers
EuroInternational drivers
Arrow McLaren SP drivers